Christian Oberstolz (born 8 August 1977 in Innichen) is an Italian luger who has competed since 1997. He won seven medals at the FIL World Luge Championships with two silvers (Men's doubles: 2011, Mixed team: 2007) and five bronzes (Men's doubles: 2015, 2016, Doubles sprint: 2016, Mixed team: 2004, 2005).

At the FIL European Luge Championships, Oberstolz won nine medals with two golds (Men's doubles: 2008, 2014), four silvers (Men's doubles: 2004; Mixed team: 2004, 2006, 2013) and three bronzes (Men's doubles: 2006; Mixed team: 2012, 2014).

Oberstolz has competed in three Winter Olympics, earning his best finish of fourth in the men's doubles event at Vancouver in 2010.

He won the overall men's doubles Luge World Cup title in 2004–05.

Oberstolz is married to fellow Russian-Italian luger Anastasia Oberstolz-Antonova who sat out the 2006–07 Luge World Cup season to pregnancy, giving birth to a daughter, Alexandra, on 14 May 2007.

References
FIL-Luge profile
Hickok sports information on World champions in luge and skeleton.

External links 
 
 
 

1977 births
Living people
Italian male lugers
Olympic lugers of Italy
Lugers at the 2002 Winter Olympics
Lugers at the 2006 Winter Olympics
Lugers at the 2010 Winter Olympics
Lugers at the 2014 Winter Olympics
Lugers of Centro Sportivo Carabinieri
Italian lugers
People from Innichen
Sportspeople from Südtirol